The 1993 Montana Grizzlies football team was an American football team that represented the University of Montana as a member of the Big Sky Conference during the 1993 NCAA Division I-AA football season. In their eighth year under head coach Don Read, the Grizzlies compiled an overall record of 10–2 with a mark of 7–0 in conference play, winning the Big Sky Title. Montana advanced to the NCAA Division I-AA Football Championship playoffs, where the Grizzlies lost to Delaware in the first round. Montana played home games at Washington–Grizzly Stadium in Missoula, Montana.

Schedule

References

Montana
Montana Grizzlies football seasons
Big Sky Conference football champion seasons
Montana Grizzlies football